Iron Gate, or Iron Gates may refer to:
 Gates of Alexander, iron gates built by Alexander the Great
 Iron Gates (Algeria), a pass through the Bibans mountains in Algeria 
 Iron Gate Pass, a gorge in central Xinjiang, People's Republic of China
 Iron Gate (Central Asia), a defile between Balkh and Samarkand
 Iron Gates is a gorge on the Danube River, forming part of the boundary between Serbia and Romania
 Iron Gate (Diocletian's Palace)
 Iron-Gate Square (Warsaw)
 Iron Gate, Virginia,  a small town located in Alleghany County, Virginia
 Iron Gate I Hydroelectric Power Station (Romania, Serbia)
 Iron Gate II Hydroelectric Power Station (Romania, Serbia)
 Iron Gate, one of the Gates of the Temple Mount
 Iron Gates, a section of Samariá Gorge, Crete
 Cairo Station, a 1958 Egyptian film also known as The Iron Gate
 Iron Gate AB, the developer of the video game Valheim

See also
Puerta de Hierro (disambiguation) ("Iron Gate" in Spanish)